Calico Skies is a 2016 American thriller drama film directed by Valerio Esposito, starring Tom Sizemore, Christina Bennett Lind, Vincent Pastore, Kiowa Gordon, Charlotte De Bruyne and Robert LaSardo.

Cast
 Tom Sizemore as Phoenix
 Christina Bennett Lind as Ariel
 Vincent Pastore as Vincenzo
 Kiowa Gordon as Bamboo
 Charlotte De Bruyne as Charlotte
 Robert LaSardo as Macarena
  as Luigi

Reception
Paul Parcellin of Film Threat gave the film a score of 7 out of 10 and wrote that while "Sizemore inhabits his role as a loner so deftly that most of his interactions with secondary characters feel under-written and are less engaging than his solo time on screen", the "struggles, humanity and neurotic tendencies of his infectious character keep this strange tale of regret and doomed hope for salvation alive in the darkness of the desert’s blazing sunlight."

Peter Martin of ScreenAnarchy wrote that while it is "worthwhile" to "watch Tom Sizemore in a lead role", his character "ultimately becomes frustrating as the central character because none of the few other characters rise up to balance his inaction with any meaningful responses until very late in the narrative."

References

External links
 
 

American thriller drama films
2016 thriller drama films